Franklin and David Thomas (both died 13 February 1995) were convicted murderers who were executed by Saint Vincent and the Grenadines (SVG). Their executions, along with that of Douglas Hamlet, are the most recent executions performed by SVG, and questions about the fairness of the Thomas brothers' execution have been raised.

Franklin and David Thomas were convicted of murder and received mandatory death sentences. After their appeal to SVG appeal courts failed, they were notified on Friday, 9 February 1995 that their executions would take place the following Monday morning. However, they still had a legal right to appeal to the Judicial Committee of the Privy Council (JCPC) in London, which is the supreme court for SVG. The brothers were executed by hanging early on Monday morning before having lodged an appeal with the JCPC. Amnesty International and other organizations found out about the scheduled executions approximately 36 hours before they took place.

General references

1995 deaths
20th-century executions by Saint Vincent and the Grenadines
Executed Saint Vincent and the Grenadines people
Sibling duos
People executed by Saint Vincent and the Grenadines by hanging
People executed for murder
Saint Vincent and the Grenadines people convicted of murder
People convicted of murder by Saint Vincent and the Grenadines
Year of birth missing